"Fall Together" is a song written and performed by Australian indie rock band The Temper Trap. It is included as the fifth track on their third studio album Thick as Thieves. It was released on 12 April 2016.

Chart performance

References

External links
 The Temper Trap Official Website

2016 singles
The Temper Trap songs
2016 songs